Mack Beggs (born 1999) is an American former high school wrestler from Euless, Texas. Beggs is a trans man. State athletic rules only allowed him to compete in the league for the sex he was assigned at birth. In 2017, he defeated Chelsea Sanchez in the girls' league to win the Texas girls' 110 lb championship. In 2018, he won the second consecutive state title, defeating Chelsea Sanchez again. In 2019, Beggs was featured in the ESPN 30 for 30 documentary short film Mack Wrestles and as part of the feature-length documentary Changing the Game.

Wrestling

High school career
En route to the state championships in 2017, two of his opponents forfeited. He ended the 2017 season with a 57–0 record, winning the 110 lb weight class in the girls' division.

In 2018, he was the best in the girls' division with a 32-0 record.

His State Championships are considered controversial by some because of the low doses of testosterone Beggs was said to have been taking beginning his high school freshman year.  Citing the possible advantages testosterone could give Beggs over his female wrestling competitors, some wrestlers and their parents protested, some even forfeiting matches. Beggs took hormone blockers to prevent any advantage that could be provided by the synthetic testosterone.

During high school, Beggs also had finishes in boys' division tournaments, including third place in Greco-Roman (3 person bracket) and third in freestyle wrestling at the USA Wrestling Texas State Championships in 2018 (6 person bracket).

College career
In 2018, Beggs was given an opportunity to wrestle at the collegiate level as a walk-on in the men's division in a NAIA school. On his Instagram, Beggs announced that he would wrestle for Life University. 

He did not compete in the 2018-19 collegiate wrestling season due to surgery.

Activism 
Beggs has called on state legislators to alter University Interscholastic League regulations that require athletes to compete under their gender assigned at birth. Beggs has also stated that the debate over legislation like Senate Bill 6 (also known as the Texas Bathroom Bill) has motivated him to advocate for transgender youth.

References 

Living people
Transgender sportsmen
Transgender men
Sportspeople from Texas
American male sport wrestlers
American LGBT sportspeople
LGBT people from Texas
1999 births
LGBT sport wrestlers